Erland Dahlen (born 15 May 1971 in Ulefoss, Norway) is a Norwegian drummer and percussionist. He is a member of several bands in the elektronika/jazz/experimental music genre, like "HET", "Boschamaz", "Kiruna", "Morris" and "Piston Ltd."

Career 
Dahlen is a widely used studio and live musician in Norway. From 2005 to 2008 he was a semi-permanent drummer for Madrugada and contributed in the albums The Deep End, Live at Tralfamadore and Madrugada as well as live shows. 
In addition, he has contributed on albums with, among others, Kaada MECD (2004) and Music For Moviebikers (2006), Odd Nordstoga Heim te Mor (2006) and Pilegrim (2008), Hanne Hukkelberg Little Things fra 2004), Rykestrasse 68 (2006) and Blood From A Stone (2009), Marit Larsen Under the Surface (2006), Xploding Plastix Treated Timber Resists Rot (2008) and Bjørn Eidsvåg Pust (2008). In 2012 he released his first solo album Rolling Bomber.

Honors 
2010: Gammleng-prisen in the class Studio musician

Discography

Solo albums 
2012: Rolling Bomber (Hubro Music)
2015: Blossom Bells (Hubro Music)
2017: Clocks (Hubro Music)
2020: Bones (Hubro Music)

Collaborative works 
With Kaada
2004: MECD (Warner Music)
2006: Music For Moviebikers (Warner Music)

With Hanne Hukkelberg
2004: Little Things (Propeller Recordings)
2007: Rykestrasse 68 (Propeller Recordings)
2009: Blood From A Stone (Propeller Recordings)
	
With Ragnar Sør Olsen
2004: Dagane (Nyrenning)

With Madrugada
2005: The Deep End (EMI Music, Norway)
2005: Live at Tralfamadore (EMI Music, Virgin Records)
2008: Madrugada (EMI Music)

With Odd Nordstoga
2006: Heim te Mor (Universal Music, Norway)
2008: Pilegrim (Sonet Music)

With Charlotte & The Co-Stars
2009: Win Love Win (Propeller Recordings)

With Marit Larsen
2006: Under the Surface (Virgin Records, EMI Music, Norway)

With Xploding Plastix
2008: Treated Timber Resists Rot (Beatservice Records)

With Bjørn Eidsvåg
2008: Pust (Petroleum Records)

With Eivind Aarset & The Sonic Codex Orchestra
2010: Live Extracts (Jazzland Recordings)

With Batagraf
2012: Say And Play (ECM Records)

With Stian Westerhus & Pale Horses
2014: Maelstrom (Rune Grammofon)

With Nils Petter Molvær
2014: Switch  (OKeh Records)
2016: Buoyancy (OKeh Records)

With Anneli Drecker
2015: Rocks And Straws (Rune Grammofon)
2017: Revelation For Personal Use (Rune Grammofon)

References

External links
Erland Dahlen: Rolling Bomber – Review at JazzWrap – A Jazz Music Blog

1971 births
Living people
Musicians from Ulefoss
20th-century Norwegian drummers
21st-century Norwegian drummers
Norwegian jazz drummers
Male drummers
Norwegian percussionists
Norwegian composers
Norwegian male composers
Hubro Music artists
20th-century drummers
20th-century Norwegian male musicians
21st-century Norwegian male musicians
Male jazz musicians